All the Aces is a compilation album by the band Motörhead, released in November 1993. It includes 14 of their most popular songs, 2 enhanced multimedia sections and 8 previously unreleased live songs by The Muggers (a band formed by "Fast" Eddie Clarke and Phil "Philthy Animal" Taylor of Motörhead with John "Speedy" Keen and Billy Rath).

Track listing

Track List

CD 2 - "The Muggers Tapes"
 "White Lightning"
 "Space Chaser"
 "Somethin' Else" (Eddie Cochran cover)
 "Would If I Could"
 "(Just A) Nightmare"
 "Cinnamon Girl" (Neil Young cover)
 "Summertime Blues" (Eddie Cochran cover)
 "Killer, Killer"

References

Motörhead compilation albums
1993 greatest hits albums
Heavy metal compilation albums